Fernandocrambus fuscus is a moth in the family Crambidae. It was described by Per Olof Christopher Aurivillius in 1922 and is found in Chile.

References

Crambini
Moths described in 1922
Moths of South America
Endemic fauna of Chile